Ricardo de Freitas Carreira (born January 20, 1978) is a former Brazilian football player.

Playing career
In 2001, Freitas joined Japanese J2 League club Ventforet Kofu which finished at the bottom place for 2 years in a row (1999-2000). He debuted in J2 against Shonan Bellmare on March 17. Although he played many matches as center back, Ventforet finished at the bottom place for 3 years in a row and he left Ventforet end of 2001 season.

Club statistics

References

External links

1978 births
Living people
Brazilian footballers
Brazilian expatriate footballers
Expatriate footballers in Japan
J2 League players
Ventforet Kofu players
Association football defenders